Boscolo is an Italian surname. Notable people with the surname include:

Enore Boscolo (born 1929), Italian footballer
Luigi Boscolo, 19th-century Italian engraver
José Luis Boscolo (born 1971), Brazilian footballer

See also
Boscolo Hotels, an Italian hotel chain

Italian-language surnames